28 Days Later: The Soundtrack Album is the accompanying soundtrack album and original score composed by John Murphy, for the 2002 film of the same name. It was released in CD format on the 17 June 2003 additionally including tracks from Brian Eno, Grandaddy and Blue States, which also featured in the film.

The second movement of "East Hastings" by the Canadian post-rock band Godspeed You! Black Emperor, albeit condensed, appeared in the film but not on the soundtrack album because the rights for the song could not be obtained.

Track listing 
All tracks performed by John Murphy unless otherwise stated.

Tracks 22 and 23 appear on the U.S. release only.

Reception and single releases 

"In the House – In a Heartbeat" is an instrumental metal track performed by John Murphy. The track was featured over the climactic confrontation of the film, and recurs in several scenes in the sequel, 28 Weeks Later. It is also featured in a climactic torture and fight scene in 2010's Kick-Ass and throughout the sequel Kick-Ass 2, and in a trailer for the post-apocalyptic videogame Metro 2033 and appeared again in the Metro Exodus trailer, which is another game in the franchise. The BBC used the track in a number of their television programmes in July 2011. It was used in tense or large scale moments in Top Gear, The Apprentice and Richard Hammond's Journey To.... The song was covered by British Death Metal band The Rotted on their album Get Dead Or Die Trying, and indie developer James Silva for the Xbox Live Arcade game The Dishwasher: Vampire Smile, in a Guitar Hero style mini-game segment where the protagonists play guitar solos. It was used in the trailer of Beowulf. This iteration was included in one of the game's soundtracks when released for free on the developer's bandcamp site, where it was dubbed "Iffenhaus – In a Heartbeat (John Murphy Homage)". An unofficial arrangement of it was used in the final scene of the first episode of the anime Highschool of the Dead. The Italian band Eldritch used the song on the first CD of their 2008 live album Livequake as an intro. It has also been featured in a Strongbow cider advert on British television. A trance remix was also produced by the Irish duo Tucandeo in 2013.

"Season Song", a song performed by British band Blue States, from their 2002 album Man Mountain, was released as a single, containing a remixed version by Rui da Silva and a "Taxi" (Ave Maria) remix by Jacknife Lee.

References 

28 Days Later
2003 soundtrack albums
John Murphy (composer) soundtracks
Horror film soundtracks